Kristīne Djadenko is a beauty queen who represented Latvia in Miss World 2007 in China, and Miss International 2008 in Macau, China. She previously received the title of Miss Latvia 2005.

Having achieved her bachelor's degree in International Law, she worked in a media agency while studying for her master's degree in Civil Law.

References

External links

Miss World 2007 delegates
1984 births
Living people
Latvian beauty pageant winners
Miss International 2008 delegates